Joseph Edward Filippelli (March 26, 1915 – August 17, 2001), known professionally as Flip Phillips, was an American jazz tenor saxophone and clarinet player. He is best remembered for his work with Norman Granz's Jazz at the Philharmonic concerts from 1946 to 1957. Phillips recorded an album for Verve when he was in his 80s. He performed in a variety of genres, including mainstream jazz, swing, and jump blues.

Career
He was born in Brooklyn, New York, United States. During the 1930s, Phillips played clarinet in a restaurant in Brooklyn. After that he was a member of bands led by Frankie Newton, Red Norvo, Benny Goodman, and Wingy Manone. He was a regular soloist for the Woody Herman band in the middle 1940s and for the next ten years performed with Jazz at the Philharmonic. He retired to Florida, but after fifteen years he returned to music, recording again and performing into his 80s.

He recorded extensively for Clef in the 1940s and 1950s, including a 1949 album of small-group tracks under his leadership with Buddy Morrow, Tommy Turk, Kai Winding, Sonny Criss, Ray Brown, and Shelly Manne. He accompanied Billie Holiday on her 1952 album Billie Holiday Sings.

He died in August 2001, in Fort Lauderdale, Florida, at the age of 86.

Discography

As leader
 Flip Phillips Collates (Clef, 1952)
 Flip Phillips Collates Vol. 2 (Clef, 1953)
 Flip Phillips Quartet (Mercury, 1953)
 Jumping Moods (Clef, 1954)
 Rock with Flip (Clef, 1954)
 The Flip Phillips Buddy Rich Trio (Clef, 1954)
 Flip Phillips Quintet (Clef, 1955)
 The Battle of the Saxes (American Recording Society, 1956)
 Flip (Clef, 1956)
 Flip Wails (Clef, 1956)
 Swingin' with Flip Phillips and His Orchestra (1956)
 Flip in Florida (Onyx, 1963)
 Your Place or Mine? (Jump, 1963)
 Flip Phillips Revisited (1965)
 Phillips's Head (Choice, 1975)
 John & Joe  (Chiaroscuro, 1977)
 Live at the Beowulf (1978)
 Flipenstein (Progressive, 1981)
 The Claw: Live at the Floating Jazz Festival (Chiaroscuro, 1986)
 A Sound Investment with Scott Hamilton (Concord Jazz, 1987)
 A Real Swinger (Concord Jazz, 1988)
 Try a Little Tenderness (Chiaroscuro, 1992)
 Live at the 1993 Floating Jazz Festival (Chiaroscuro, 1993)
 Spanish Eyes (Candid, 1997)
 John & Joe Revisited (Chiaroscuro, 1999)
 Swing Is the Thing! (Verve, 2000)
 Celebrates His 80th Birthday at the March of Jazz 1995 (Arbors, 2003)
 Live at the Beowulf: Arbors Historical Series, Vol. 5 (Arbors, 2004)

As sideman
With Johnny Hodges
 In a Tender Mood (Norgran, 1952 [1955])

With Gene Krupa and Buddy Rich
 The Drum Battle (Verve, 1952 [1960])

With Charlie Parker
 Big Band (Clef, 1954)

External links

References

1915 births
2001 deaths
20th-century American saxophonists
American jazz clarinetists
American jazz tenor saxophonists
American male saxophonists
Bebop saxophonists
Jump blues musicians
Mainstream jazz saxophonists
Swing saxophonists
East Coast blues musicians
Candid Records artists
Chiaroscuro Records artists
Gemini Records artists
Verve Records artists
20th-century American male musicians
American male jazz musicians
Mercury Records artists
Concord Records artists
Arbors Records artists